The Egyptian Starch, Yeast and Detergents is an Egyptian company specializing in producing of Rice Starch, Baking Yeast and Detergents. It was established in 1927 during Egypt's nationalization program as The Egyptian Starch and Yeast, which has been the country's main provider with 86% of market share of baking yeast, starch and confectionery at that time.

References

 Bloomberg Businessweek
 Kompass

External links
 Official website

Food companies of Egypt
Food and drink companies established in 1927
Chemical companies established in 1927
1927 establishments in Egypt
Government-owned companies of Egypt
Companies based in Alexandria